is a Japanese music composer, pianist, sound designer, sound director and music director who works for the video game company Nintendo. He is best known for his many contributions to the Super Mario and The Legend of Zelda series of video games, among others produced by the company. Kondo was hired by Nintendo in 1984, becoming the first person hired by them to specialize in video game music. His work in the Mario and Zelda series have been cited as among the most memorable in video games, such as the Super Mario Bros. overworld theme.

Biography

Early life
Kondo was born in Nagoya, Japan, on August 13, 1961. Kondo began taking Yamaha Music classes from kindergarten, where he learned to play the electronic organ from the age of five. Kondo also played the marimbas in his elementary school band. He later improved his skills with the electronic organ in a cover band that played jazz and rock music. Kondo studied at the Art Planning Department of Osaka University of Arts, but was never classically trained or academically dedicated to music.

With a love of arcade video games such as Space Invaders and the early Donkey Kong series, he said video games were the only place where he could find the kind of sound creation that he was looking for. He gained experience in composing, arranging pieces and computer programming through using the piano, and a computer to program music into the Famicom using Famicom BASIC, for which Kondo wrote part of the instruction manual in which he demonstrates how to program Japanese popular music into the Famicom using BASIC programming.

Career

In 1984, during Kondo's senior year, Nintendo sent his university a message recruiting for music composition and sound programming. He successfully applied for the job without requiring any demo tapes. He recalls, "I found my way to Nintendo by looking at the school's job placement board. You're supposed to apply to many different companies, but I saw the Nintendo ad, and had a love of making synthesizers, and loved games, and thought – that's the place for me. I interviewed with one company, Nintendo, and that's where I've been ever since." Kondo was the third person hired by Nintendo to create music and sound effects for its games, joining Hirokazu Tanaka and Yukio Kaneoka. However, he was the first at Nintendo to actually specialize in musical composition.

His first work at Nintendo was the audio design for the 1984 arcade game Punch-Out!!. As the Famicom had become popular in Japan by then, Kondo was assigned to compose music for the console's subsequent games at Nintendo's new development division, Nintendo Entertainment Analysis and Development (EAD). His second work at Nintendo was an instruction manual on how to program Japanese popular music into the Famicom using the peripheral Family BASIC. To conclude his first year at Nintendo, he created some of the music of Devil World, alongside Akito Nakatsuka. In 1985, Nintendo started marketing the Famicom abroad as the Nintendo Entertainment System (NES) to capitalize on the 1983 video game crash that had devastated Atari, Inc. and other companies. Super Mario Bros. was Kondo's first major score. The game's melodies were created with the intention that short segments of music could be endlessly repeated during the same gameplay without causing boredom. The main theme is iconic in popular culture and has been featured in more than 50 concerts, been a best-selling ringtone, and been remixed or sampled by various musicians.

Kondo's work on The Legend of Zelda scores has also become highly recognized. He produced four main pieces of background music for the first installment of the series; the overworld theme has become comparable in popularity with the Super Mario Bros. main theme. After the success of The Legend of Zelda, he provided the score for two Japanese-exclusive games, The Mysterious Murasame Castle (1986) and Shin Onigashima (1987). He created the soundtrack to Yume Kōjō: Doki Doki Panic (1987), which was later rebranded outside Japan as Super Mario Bros. 2 in 1988.

Kondo returned to the Super Mario series to produce the scores to Super Mario Bros. 3 (1988) and the SNES launch title Super Mario World (1990). Koichi Sugiyama directed a jazz arrangement album of Super Mario World music and oversaw its performance at the first Orchestral Game Musical Concert in 1991. After finishing the soundtrack to Super Mario World, Kondo was in charge of the sound programming for Pilotwings (1990), while also composing the "Helicopter Theme" for it, and created the sound effects for Star Fox (1993). In 1995, he composed for the sequel to Super Mario World, Yoshi's Island. Until the early 2000s, Kondo would usually write all compositions by himself on a project, with The Legend of Zelda: Ocarina of Time being the last one Kondo worked on alone. Since then, he has been collaborating with other staff members at Nintendo, advising and supervising music created by others, as well as providing additional compositions for games, including Super Mario Galaxy, The Legend of Zelda: Spirit Tracks, The Legend of Zelda: Skyward Sword and Super Mario 3D World. He also served as the sound director and lead composer of Super Mario Maker and its sequel, Super Mario Maker 2.
He has also worked alongside Brian Tyler to compose for Illumination's The Super Mario Bros. Movie.

Concerts
Kondo attended the world premiere of Play! A Video Game Symphony at the Rosemont Theater in Rosemont, Illinois in May 2006, where his music from the Super Mario Bros. and The Legend of Zelda series was performed by a full symphony orchestra. He also attended and performed in a series of three concerts celebrating the 25th anniversary of The Legend of Zelda series in late 2011. He performed piano with the American rock band Imagine Dragons live at The Game Awards 2014 ceremony in December 2014.

Musical style and influences
Kondo's music for Super Mario Bros. was designed around the feeling of motion that mirrors the player's physical experience. This followed the philosophy of series creator and designer, Shigeru Miyamoto, who demanded that audio for the game be made "with substance" and are synchronized with elements of the game. As a result, Kondo based a number of the score around genres that are primarily used for dancing, such as Latin music and the waltz.

In the first The Legend of Zelda, Kondo juxtaposes the game's overworld theme with the theme that plays in dungeons. Kondo remarked on the importance of projecting distinct characters through music, so that players know almost immediately where they are within the game.  Kondo used this contrast in other games he worked on, including Super Mario Bros.

Kondo has been the recipient of much praise from many other composers such as the renowned Halo and Destiny composer Martin O'Donnell and Elder Scrolls composer Jeremy Soule.

Games

Music and sound design
All works below were composed solely by Kondo, unless otherwise noted. Some other non-musical roles are included, such as sound effects and programming.

Supporting roles
All works listed below credit Kondo in a supporting role, such as an advisor or supervisor.

Awards

|-
| 2011
| Super Mario Galaxy 2
| British Academy Games Awards (Best Original Music)
| 
|-
| rowspan="2" | 2014
| rowspan="2" | Super Mario 3D World
| British Academy Games Awards (Best Original Music)
| 
|-
| Video Game Music Online (Best Soundtrack – Retro / Remixed)
| 
|}

References

External links
 

1961 births
20th-century Japanese composers
20th-century Japanese male musicians
20th-century Japanese pianists
21st-century Japanese composers
21st-century Japanese male musicians
21st-century Japanese pianists
Chiptune musicians
Japanese male composers
Japanese male pianists
Japanese pianists
Japanese sound designers
Living people
Mario (franchise) music
Musicians from Aichi Prefecture
Nintendo people
Osaka University of Arts alumni
People from Nagoya
Video game composers